St. George's Hill is a northern hamlet in the Canadian prairie province of Saskatchewan. It is located where the Highway 925 spans the Dillon River about 10 kilometres south of Dillon. The mayor is Donna Janvier.

Demographics 

In 2011, 85 residents used Dene (Denesuline) as their mother tongue in 2011.

See also 

 List of communities in Northern Saskatchewan
 List of communities in Saskatchewan

References 

Division No. 18, Saskatchewan
Northern hamlets in Saskatchewan
Dene communities